Planet of the Apes is a 1974 American science fiction television series that was broadcast on CBS. The series features Roddy McDowall, Ron Harper, James Naughton, and Mark Lenard. It is based on the 1968 film of the same name and its sequels, which were, in turn, based on the 1963 novel Planet of the Apes by Pierre Boulle.

Overview
The series begins with the crash of an Earth spaceship that encountered a time warp while approaching Alpha Centauri on August 19, 1980. The spaceship is crewed by three astronauts, one of whom has died in the crash. The other two astronauts, Colonel Alan Virdon and Major Peter J. Burke, are unconscious but are rescued by a old man who carries them to an old bomb shelter. After the old man opens a book containing historical text and pictures of Earth circa 2500, the two astronauts are convinced that they are indeed on a future Earth.

The crash is also witnessed by a young chimpanzee who tells his father, a village official who alerts the authorities. Ape councilor Zaius (an analog of the character from the original movie), notes that another such incident occurred ten years earlier. He orders the chief gorilla, Security Chief Urko, to find the humans and bring them back alive. Zaius wants to find out as much as he can about the humans before they are eventually killed. Zaius doesn't trust Urko to follow his orders and bring back any surviving humans, so he sends along his newly hired chimpanzee assistant, Galen.

Both Virdon and Burke go back to their ship to check the ship's chronometer. They are more than 1000 years in the future from when they left Earth. Virdon insists on retrieving the ship's flight log in the hopes that they will be able to analyze it and be able to return to their own time period, but while they are at the ship, they are captured, and the old man is subsequently killed by a group of apes.

Galen finds the human book that the old man had been carrying. He reads parts of the book and begins to doubt the history that he has been told: apes have always been dominant, and humans have always been inferior and subservient. When Galen finds out that Urko has arranged for the two astronauts to escape and be killed in the attempt, he stops the shooter and helps the humans escape. During the escape, a guard is killed, and Galen is found standing over him with a gun in his hand.

Galen discusses the book that he found with Zaius, who then accuses him of heresy. Galen is sentenced to death for his crime. Then Virdon and Burke find out about his sentence and rescue Galen. They are all then declared enemies of the state and become fugitives. The three fugitives thereafter wander around the territory that used to be the western United States having various encounters with apes, humans, and old human civilization ruins.

Cast

 Roddy McDowall as Galen, a young chimpanzee that is sent by Zaius with Urko to ensure the safety of two humans that have survived a crash landing on Earth. McDowall previously played Cornelius and Caesar throughout the various movie versions.
 Ron Harper as Colonel Alan Virdon, the human commander of the crash-landed spaceship from 20th Century Earth.
 James Naughton as Major Peter J. Burke, a human astronaut that also survived the crash.
 Mark Lenard as Security Chief Urko, a violent gorilla and the series' main antagonist.
 Booth Colman as Councillor Zaius, the highest-ranking member of the High Council of Central City in the year 3085.
 John Hoyt as Barlow, a chimpanzee prefect of Kaymak who had introduced gladiatorial fights between the humans in "The Gladiators", and whose horse later competes against Urko's in "The Horse Race".
 Jacqueline Scott, as a chimpanzee farmer's daughter Zantes in "The Good Seeds", and as Kira, Galen's chimpanzee ex-fiancée and surgeon, in "The Surgeon".

Episodes

Production
Discussions for a Planet of the Apes television series were made by producer Arthur P. Jacobs as early as 1971. Because of the success of the movies, the idea of a television series was delayed until after the completion of Battle for the Planet of the Apes during the first half of 1973. However, soon after the premiere of Battle, Jacobs died, and his production company APJAC Productions sold all Planet of the Apes rights and privileges to 20th Century Fox. Subsequently, television rights for the first three Planet of the Apes movies were sold to CBS and broadcast successfully during September 1973. Based largely on high viewership of "movie-of-the-week" television broadcasts of the first few movies, CBS began to disfavor other contenders for a new science-fiction series, including Gene Roddenberry's Genesis II (1973) and favor proposals for a Planet of the Apes television series. Fox and CBS then continued Jacob's plans of a series the next year.

CBS ordered 14 episodes of Planet of the Apes to be produced. The series was filmed for the most part on location at what is now Malibu Creek State Park, with a budget of about $250,000 for each episode. Originally scheduled to be broadcast during CBS's Tuesday night family hour, the first regular episode of the series was broadcast on Friday, September 13, 1974 from 8:00-9:00 PM. The remainder of the series was broadcast during this same time slot until December 27, 1974, when its 14th and final broadcast was shown as a result of a premature cancellation of the series due to poor ratings.

Music

The series' main theme music was composed by Lalo Schifrin; Schifrin also scored three episodes of the series - "Escape From Tomorrow," "The Gladiators" and "The Good Seeds" (the latter, though not the premiere episode, was the first to be scored). Earle Hagen composed the scores for "The Legacy" and "Tomorrow's Tide," while Richard LaSalle wrote an original score for "The Trap." In addition, three episodes received partial scores - Hagen composed one for "The Surgeon," LaSalle composed "The Deception," and music supervisor Lionel Newman composed his only music for the series with "The Interrogation" (those last three, like the other episodes, were otherwise tracked with the music composed previously).

Intrada album

In 2005, Intrada released an album featuring Lalo Schifrin's beginning and ending music along with all three of Schifrin's scores and Earle Hagen's "The Legacy." The album also includes the logo music for Twentieth Century-Fox Television by Alfred Newman.

{{Track listing
| total_length = 68:46
| collapsed = yes
| title1 = Main Title
| length1 = 1:16
| title2 = Escape From Tomorrow: The Spaceship
| length2 = 2:38
| title3 = Apes
| length3 = 2:46
| title4 = The Warp
| length4 = 2:03
| title5 = Urko and Galen
| length5 = 4:04
| title6 = Prison Guard
| length6 = 1:58
| title7 = Jail Break
| length7 = 3:29
| title8 = Your World
| length8 = 3:29
| title9 = The Gladiators: Jason
| length9 = 1:53
| title10 = Fighting
| length10 = 2:13
| title11 = Barlow 
| length11 = 1:50
| title12 = Trouble
| length12 = 2:25
| title13 = Into the Arena
| length13 = 2:46
| title14 = There Will Be Death
| length14 = 0:53
| title15 = Humans Versus Apes
| length15 = 2:33
| title16 = A Beginning
| length16 = 2:28
| title17 = The Legacy: Into the Ruined City
| length17 = 2:25
| title18 = The Machine
| length18 = 0:50
| title19 = The Soldiers
| length19 = 2:30
| title20 = The Key
| length20 = 1:23
| title21 = Virdon and the Kid
| length21 = 1:10
| title22 = The Family
| length22 = 1:56
| title23 = The Reward
| length23 = 2:23
| title24 = Knowledge Hunts
| length24 = 3:11
| title25 = Farewell
| length25 = 0:35
| title26 = The Good Seeds: Riding for Urko
| length26 = 3:16
| title27 = Travel Without Stars
| length27 = 3:16
| title28 = Attack
| length28 = 3:16
| title29 = Bonded Humans
| length29 = 2:27
| title30 = Next String
| length30 = 2:27
| title31 = End Credits
| length31 = 0:28
}}

La-La Land album

In 2015, La-La Land Records issued a remastered and expanded limited edition album, featuring all six original scores plus the Newman material.

Disc 1: Music by Lalo Schifrin

Disc 2: Theme by Lalo Schifrin, Music by Richard LaSalle, Earle Hagen and Lionel Newman

Unfilmed episodes

 "Episode One" (written by Rod Serling as pilot episode; radically different from what was broadcast).
 "Episode Two" (written by Rod Serling as follow-up to his version of the pilot).
 "Hostage" (written by Stephen Kandel).
 "A Fallen God" (written by Anthony Lawrence).
 "The Trek" (written by Jim Byrnes).
 "Freedom Road" (written by Arthur Rowe).
 "The Mine" (written by Paul Savage).
 "The Trial" (written by Edward J. Lakso).

The scripts for "Episode One", "Episode Two", "Hostage" and "A Fallen God" are available online at Hunter's Planet of the Apes Archive. Details regarding "The Trek," "Freedom Road," "The Mine," and "The Trial" were provided in issue 12 of Simian Scrolls (a Planet of the Apes-based magazine), reprinted from the television series writer's bible.

Broadcast history
The series was broadcast in the U.S. from September 13 to December 20, 1974. The show was canceled after half a season because of poor ratings due at least partly to direct competition by NBC's Sanford and Son and Chico and the Man. Only thirteen of its fourteen episodes were broadcast; all 14 episodes were later included in the DVD box set. It was later shown in reruns on the Sci Fi Channel. It also appeared on Monday nights on the Seven Network in Australia during 1975, then was repeated at 7:30pm Saturday evenings from 3 January 1976 and this was followed by subsequent screenings.

The series was broadcast in Britain by 13 of the 14 ITV companies from 13 October 1974 each Sunday, until 18 January 1975. Scottish Television (STV) never broadcast it during 1974/75, opting to broadcast Sale of the Century instead. The show was repeated in many regions from September 1975 until 1978, but was still not broadcast by STV. The series then received its first UK-wide transmissions on Channel 4 in 1994, and later the Sci Fi Channel. The television movie compilations have also been screened on Sky Movies, True Movies, True Entertainment (which also broadcast the show in original form) and Horror Channel.

During 2019, MeTV began broadcasting the series as part of its late Saturday Night "Red Eye Sci-Fi" block.

Telefilms
In 1980, several episodes of the series were edited into five made-for-television movies.

 Back to the Planet of the Apes ("Escape from Tomorrow" & "The Trap")
 Forgotten City of the Planet of the Apes ("Gladiators" & "Legacy")
 Treachery and Greed on the Planet of the Apes ("Horse Race" & "The Tyrant")
 Life, Liberty and Pursuit on the Planet of the Apes ("The Surgeon" & "The Interrogation")
 Farewell to the Planet of the Apes ("Tomorrow's Tide" & "Up Above The World So High")

When the Planet of the Apes telefilms began syndication, ABC's owned and operated stations, who bought them for their afternoon movie programs (with titles such as The 4:30 Movie), asked Roddy McDowall to re-create his role of Galen in a series of new beginnings and endings specifically for these stations, billed as "The New Planet of the Apes". The introductions created originally by 20th Century Fox to begin each film were replaced by a now-aged Galen (McDowall) examining the events of the telefilms. The beginnings and endings revealed Virdon and Burke's final fates: "They found their computer in another city and disappeared into space as suddenly as they’d arrived". According to "TV Zone Special #17" (1995 issue) McDowall filmed these "two years after the demise of the first run episodes of the Planet of the Apes television series", which would be December 1976. The ABC openings and closings of these telefilms were neither broadcast by other stations nor included on any home media release.

 Spinoffs 
Most of the books and comics based on Planet of the Apes are based on the movies, not the television series. However, there are some titles that do involve the television show characters:

 Novels 
Novelizations: Four novelizations of episodes, written by George Alec Effinger, were published by Award Books. Their titles are:
 Planet of the Apes #1: Man the Fugitive.
 Planet of the Apes #2: Escape From Tomorrow.
 Planet of the Apes #3: Journey Into Terror.
 Planet of the Apes #4: Lord of the Apes.

 Comics 
British Annuals: Brown Watson Books published three hardcover annuals featuring original stories about Virdon, Burke and Galen. These stories are a combination of comic strips and short fiction.

Argentine Comics: Seven Spanish-language comics were published in Argentina, written by Jorge Claudio Morhain and Richard Barreiro and illustrated by Sergio Mulko and T. Toledo. Released only in Argentina, they have never been published officially in English. However, PDFs of the comics, translated to English by fans, are available at Kassidy Rae's site (see link below).

Filmstrip Story: Chad Valley, a U.K. toy company, produced 32 short film-based comic strips containing an original TV-series-era story, presented as the Chad Valley Picture Show Planet of the Apes Sliderama Projector (very similar to the many Give-a-Show projector sets of the 1970s). These strips are extremely rare and difficult to find.

 Audio 
Audio Adventures—Power Records produced four audio-only adventures based on the TV show. Their titles were:
 Mountain of the Delphi Battle of Two Worlds Dawn of the Tree People Volcano Notes and references 

External links

 
 Kassidy's POTA Television Series Site  - Galen's final TV appearance, Argentine comics, screencaps, collectibles, articles, photos, books, stories and more
 Stories From Chalo  a POTA TV website
 Mez's UK site - an older POTA TV site 
 Hunter's Planet of the Apes Archive – Extensive fan site with information on all original films and series, with full television scripts, comics and other relevant material
 Planet of the Apes Media Archive – Multi-media website
 Planet of the Apes: The Forbidden Zone – One of the oldest and most complete Planet of the Apes'' sites
 
 
 
 
 

Alpha Centauri in fiction
Planet of the Apes
CBS original programming
Television series by 20th Century Fox Television
1970s American science fiction television series
1974 American television series debuts
1974 American television series endings
Television shows about chimpanzees
Television series set in the future
Live action television shows based on films
Television series based on adaptations
Television shows based on French novels
Post-apocalyptic television series
English-language television shows
Fiction set in 1980
Television series set in the 4th millennium